Cornelius Fontem Esua is a Cameroonian Prelate of the Roman Catholic Church. He served as Archbishop of the Bamenda Metropolitan See since 2006 and retired in 2020.

Life
Born in Mbetta, Esua was ordained to the priesthood on December 29, 1971.

On September 10, 1982, Esua was appointed bishop of Kumbo. Esua received his episcopal consecration on the following December 8 from archbishop Donato Squicciarini, the then apostolic nuncio to Cameroon, with the then recently appointed archbishop of Bamenda, Paul Mbiybe Verdzekov, and the bishop of Buéa, Pius Suh Awa, serving as co-consecrators.

Esua was named coadjutor archbishop of Bamenda by Pope John Paul II on December 7, 2004; he succeeded Paul Mbiybe Verdzekov as archbishop of Bamenda on January 23, 2006.

Views

Esua expressed his full intentions as Chief Pastor to advocate doctrinal views on issues like the Nkuv Affair. Quite a good number of the prominent members of the World Apostolate of Fatima (The Blue Army) became ringleaders of the unorthodox Nkuv devotion, since the latter was in some manner associated with the Fatima apparitions. It was on account of this association that the 13th of every month, and most especially the 13th of May, was taken as the official day of prayer for the Nkuvites. Since 7 October 1997, when Esua, then Bishop of Kumbo issued a pastoral Letter declaring the unorthodoxy of the Nkuv Affair and outlining the criteria for determining the authenticity of Marian apparitions, some of its adherents have withdrawn and regained full communion, some adhere both to Nkuv and to the church, and some have publicly excluded themselves from the church and pledged allegiance to Nkuv.

Esua and the other bishops of the Bamenda Ecclesiastical Province (BAPEC), issued a letter to all Christians concerning the sacrament of marriage and HIV/AIDS. All the bishops requested that before the publication of marriage banns, couples must present to the parish priest a valid and authentic medical certificate showing that they have done HIV/AIDS screening.

See also
List of Roman Catholic dioceses in Cameroon

References

External links

Catholic-Hierarchy
Bigard Memorial Seminary, Enugu (in Nigerian)
L'Effort Camerounais, Newspaper of the National Episcopal Conference of Cameroon
Catholic Church in Republic of Cameroon (Cameroon)
Catholic Church in Cameroon
All Bishops of Cameroon

21st-century Roman Catholic bishops in Cameroon
21st-century Roman Catholic archbishops in Africa
1943 births
Living people
Pontifical Biblical Institute alumni
People from Bamenda
Cameroonian Roman Catholic archbishops
Roman Catholic bishops of Kumbo
Roman Catholic archbishops of Bamenda